Saigon Kick is the eponymous debut album by the band Saigon Kick. It features backing vocals by Jeff Scott Soto.

Background
Saigon Kick's debut album was the first album to be released on the label Third Stone/Atlantic Records. This joint venture was founded in 1991 by Third Stone Records and Atlantic Records in order to distribute releases of Third Stone artists.

Critical reception

Cash Box in its favorable review noted the stylistic diversity of the album: "Saigon Kick fuses hard rock/heavy metal, '60s-inspired psychedelia and/or punk on the band's aggressive yet melodic debut album." AllMusic's Eduardo Rivadavia saw this diversity as the album's weakness but thought that the songwriting made up for it: "The band tries desperately to please everyone and though they obviously fail, their 1991 eponymous debut still features very inspired songwriting and some amazing chops from guitarist Jason Bieler."

Track listing

Personnel

Saigon Kick
 Matt Kramer – vocals
 Jason Bieler – guitar
 Tom Defile – bass
 Phil Varone – drums

Additional Musicians
 Jeff Scott Soto – backing vocals (10, 13)

Technical personnel
 Michael Wagener – production, mixing
 Craig Doubet – engineering
 George Marino – mastering
 Derek Oliver – 2018 reissue liner notes

References

Saigon Kick albums
1991 debut albums
Albums produced by Michael Wagener
Atlantic Records albums